Haberlandia shimonii is a moth in the family Cossidae. It is found in north-eastern  Gabon. The habitat consists of swamp, riparian and mixed leguminous forest types.

The wingspan is about 23 mm. The forewings are deep colonial buff with Isabella colour lines from the costal margin to the dorsum. The hindwings are deep colonial buff with a reticulated pattern of light brownish olive.

Etymology
The species is named for Shimoni Lehmann, the son of the author.

References

Natural History Museum Lepidoptera generic names catalog

Endemic fauna of Gabon
Moths described in 2011
Metarbelinae
Taxa named by Ingo Lehmann